Kevin Durell Edwards (born October 30, 1965) is an American former professional basketball player who currently serves as DePaul University men's basketball team's director of community, corporate, and professional relations. Edwards was selected by the Miami Heat with the 20th overall pick of the 1988 NBA draft. Edwards was the second ever draft pick in Miami Heat history, behind teammate Rony Seikaly who was selected as the 9th pick in the same draft.

He played in 11 NBA seasons for the Heat, New Jersey Nets, Orlando Magic and Vancouver Grizzlies. Edwards best year as a pro came during the 1993–94 season as a member of the Nets, appearing in all 82 games and averaging 14.0 ppg. He had the most points in all of his seasons with the Nets. In his NBA career, Edwards scored a total of 6,596 points in 604 games. He retired as a member of the Grizzlies in 2001. He has a wife and three children.

He played collegiately at DePaul University and Lakeland Community College (in Kirtland, Ohio).

After retiring from basketball, Edwards produced movies.

Notes

External links
Kevin Edwards Statistics - Basketball-Reference.com

1965 births
Living people
African-American basketball players
American expatriate basketball people in Canada
Basketball players from Cleveland
DePaul Blue Demons men's basketball players
Junior college men's basketball players in the United States
Lakeland Community College alumni
Miami Heat draft picks
Miami Heat players
New Jersey Nets players
Orlando Magic players
Shooting guards
Vancouver Grizzlies players
American men's basketball players
People from Cleveland Heights, Ohio
21st-century African-American people
20th-century African-American sportspeople